Korta is a village in Pali district, Rajasthan.

Villages in Pali district